Metglas is a thin amorphous metal alloy ribbon produced by using rapid solidification process of approximately . This rapid solidification creates unique ferromagnetic properties that allows the ribbon to be magnetized and de-magnetized quickly and effectively with very low core losses of approximately 5 mW/kg  at 60 Hz and a maximum relative permeability of approximately 1,000,000.

History 
Metglas is based on technology developed at AlliedSignal research facilities in Morristown, New Jersey and Vacuumschmelze in Hanau, Germany. The development of amorphous metals began in 1970. Over the years, many new alloys have been found using the same principles of rapid solidification.

Metglas, also known as metallic glass alloys, differ from traditional metals in that they have a non-crystalline structure and possess unique physical and magnetic properties that combine high permeability, strength and hardness with flexibility and toughness.

See also
 Amorphous metal transformer

References 

Magnetic alloys
Ferromagnetic materials
Amorphous metals
Electromagnetic components

de:Metallglas